Anthony Floch (born 12 February 1983 in Clermont-Ferrand, Puy-de-Dôme) is a French rugby union player, who normally plays at fullback. He currently plays for Montpellier in the Top 14.

Top 14 

He made 24 appearances, scoring 49 points, in the 2006/07 season as Clermont reached the Top 14 final and won the European Challenge Cup. In the 2011 Top 14 he scored, a 60-metre goal, with over 10 metres to spare. This was one of the biggest kicks seen. In 2013, Anthony Floch signed a deal to join French Top 14 side  Montpellier.

International career 

He was called up to the French squad by Marc Lievremont for the 2008 Six Nations Championship, where he won his first cap off the bench against England in a defeat at the Stade de France. Floch started against Italy two weeks later and scored his first international try in the first half. He held his place for the final game of the tournament against Wales in Cardiff where the hosts were victorious and secured their second Grand Slam in four seasons.

References

External links
https://web.archive.org/web/20080420161038/http://www.rugbyrama.fr/rugby/personnews_prs55156.shtml

1983 births
Living people
Sportspeople from Clermont-Ferrand
French rugby union players
France international rugby union players
French people of Breton descent
Rugby union fullbacks